The 1969–70 Israel State Cup (Gvia HaMedina) was the 31st season of Israel's nationwide football cup competition and the 16th after the Israeli Declaration of Independence.

The competition started on 20 September 1969 with Liga Gimel and Liga Dalet clubs playing the first round. Liga Bet teams joined the competition in the second round, played on 25 October 1969, and Liga Alef clubs joined the competition in the fourth round. After the fifth round the competition was suspended as the national team prepared for the 1970 FIFA World Cup, and resumed at the beginning of the next season, with Liga Leumit clubs entering the competition on the sixth round, played on 12 September 1970.

The final was played on 7 October 1970 between Maccabi Tel Aviv and Maccabi Netanya, the former winning 2–1 to earn its 14th cup.

Results

Second round

Third round

Fourth round
Liga Alef clubs entered the competition on this round. As in previous seasons, The draw was set so that Liga Alef clubs wouldn't be drawn against each other.

Fifth round

Sixth Round
Liga Leumit clubs entered the competition in this round. The IFA arranged the draw so each Liga Leumit clubs wouldn't be drawn to play each other.

Seventh Round

Quarter-finals

Semi-finals

Final

Notes

References
100 Years of Football 1906-2006, Elisha Shohat (Israel), 2006

External links
 Israel Football Association website

Israel State Cup
State Cup
State Cup
Israel State Cup seasons